Julien Rambaldi is a French film director and screenwriter.

Career

Rambaldi became known after his short film Scotch (2003) was awarded in several festivals.

He then directed the feature film Les Meilleurs Amis du monde (Best Friends in the World), released (2010).

In 2016, he directed the feature film Bienvenue à Marly-Gomont (The African Doctor).

Personal

In 2014, he had a daughter named Martha with actress Léa Drucker.

Works

Film Director:
 2003: Scotch (short)
 2010: Les Meilleurs Amis du monde (Best Friends in the World)
 2015: Jeudi 15 H
 2016: Bienvenue à Marly-Gomont (The African Doctor)

Film Writer:
 2003: Scotch (short)
 2010: Les Meilleurs Amis du monde (Best Friends in the World)

See also

 Léa Drucker
 The African Doctor

References

External sources

 
 Julien Rambaldi (Agence Adêquat)

French film directors
French screenwriters
Living people
Year of birth missing (living people)